Batrachedra velox is a species of moth of the family Batrachedridae. It was described by Edward Meyrick in 1897 and is found in Australia.

References

Batrachedridae
Moths of Australia
Moths described in 1897
Taxa named by Edward Meyrick